Jun Itami (Dong ryong YOO 유동룡 伊丹 潤; 1937–2011) is an internationally renowned Korean-Japanese architect. He was born in Tokyo 1937 to Korean parents and gained his degree in architecture at Musashi Institute of Technology (now called Tokyo City University) in 1968.
Itami Jun spent his childhood in Shizuoka, Japan and entered the world of architecture by traveling and encountering many other artists. With profound insight into objects, he learned and expressed architecture with the physical senses of touch and drawing as his medium. In the homogeneous industrial society, Itami Jun sought to practice contemporary architecture with an anti-modern bent, emphasizing purity of architecture and material, and pursuing heavy primitive architecture with a sense of rawness in the material. Itami Jun’s Jeju projects in his late years demonstrate the mature beauty of his architecture.

Bibliographie 
 1937 Born in Tokyo, Japan
 1964 Graduated from University of Musashi Institute of Technology, B.Arch 
 1968 Established Itami Jun Architect a Research Institute
 2002 Established Itami Jun Architect a Research Institute (Seoul Branch) 
 2007-2008 A member of The Japan Folk Craft Museum steering committee 
 2009-2011 Master Architect of Jeju Global Education City

Awards 
 2010  The 23rd Murano Togo Award
 2008  Excellence Award - Korea Architecture Award
 2006  Asian Award for Culture and Landscape of Settlements (International Design Competition on Asia City Housing & Environment)
 2006  Kim Swoo-geun Prize 
 2005  Légion d'honneur, Grade de chevalier dans l'ordre des Arts et des Lettres en France
 2004  Excellent prize – Gyeongju World Culture EXPO Park  International Competition 
 2001  Award of The Korea Institute of Architect 
 1992  1st prize – National Oceanic Museum  International Competition 
 1992  Good Interior Design – G.I.D competition 
 1981  Japan Sign Association Prize
 1979  Japan Shop Designer Association Prize

KARYA 
2014   Itami Jun: Architecture of the Wind, National Museum of Modern and Contemporary Art, Gwacheon, South Korea
2012   Vestigial Impressions, TOTO GALLERY MA, Tokyo, Japan
2010   Interventions in the Guggenheim Museum Rotunda, Guggenheim Museum,  New York, U.S.A
2007   Space Gallery - Solo Exhibition,  Seoul, Korea
2006   Architectural Biennale,  Beijing, China
2004   Aedes East Architecture Forum,  Berlin, Germany 
2003   Museum national des Arts asiatiques - Guimet,  Paris, France 
2000   Gallery M.A.P,  Fukuoka, Japan 
1997   Exhibition Space of Tokyo International Forum,  Tokyo, Japan
1995   Fukuoka Art Museum,  Fukuoka, Japan 
1986   Invited Work, The Museum of Modern Art,  Saitama, Japan 
1984   Fine Arts Museum,  Fukui, Japan
1983   Space Museum,  Seoul, Korea

Publications 
2009   "Selections of Traditional Arts of the Joseon and Goryeo Dynasty, Korea", Hanegi Museum Press
2008   "JUN ITAMI 1970–2008",  Shufunotomosha
2004   "Stone, Wind and Sound" ,  Hakgojae 
2002   "Jun Itami",  Kyuryudo 
1993   "Jun Itami",  Kyuryudo 
1987   "The Masterpieses: Jun Itami 1970–1987",  Kyuryudo 
1985   "The Space of Korea", Collaboration with Joo Myung-Duck,  Kyuryudo 
1984   "The Hands of 21 Persons",  Kyuryudo 
1983   "The Culture and  Architecture of Korea",  Kyuryudo 
1981   "The Architecture of Choson Period", Collaboration with Murai Osamu,  Kyuryudo 
1975   "The Folk Painting of Choson Period",  Kodansha

Projects 

JDC Jeju International English City (NCLN),  Jeju, Korea (2010)
Daebo Seowon Valley Clubhouse,  Paju, Korea (2010)
Jeju Polo Clubhouse,  Jeju, Korea (2009)
Church of Sky,  Jeju, Korea (2009)
SK Pangyo Apelbaum,  Pangyo, Korea (2009)
Ssangyong Pyungchang-dong Oboehills,  Seoul, Korea (2009)
Manghyang Museum Competition,  Youngam, Korea (2009)
PINX BIOTOPIA Townhouse,  Jeju, Korea (2008)
Hyundai Taean Golf Village Condo & Community center,  Taean, Korea (2008)
Jeju Howan Golf Clubhouse,  Jeju, Korea (2008)
Jeokseon-dong Y Building,  Seoul, Korea (2007) 
Youngchun O’Phel Clubhouse,  Yeongcheon, Korea (2007) 
ITM Architects Office,  Seoul, Korea(2007) 
Giheung SK Apelbaum Condominium,  KyoungGi-do, Korea (2005)
Yangji Waldhaus,  KyoungGi-do, Korea(2005)
PINX Duson Museum,  Jeju, Korea(2005)
Gwangjuyo Guest House,  KyoungGi-do, Korea (2004)
PINX Museum Water, Wind, Stone,  Jeju, Korea (2004)
Atelier of Park Dae-sung,  Seoul, Korea (2003)
Hakgojae,  Seoul, Korea (2003)
K-Villa,   Jeju, Korea (2003)
K-Multipurpose Building,  Seoul, Korea(2002)
Suncheon High School,  Jeollanam-do Sunchon, Korea (2002)
Guest House Old & New,   KyoungGi-do, Korea (2001)
Podo Hotel,  Jeju, Korea(2001)
1998  Jeju PINX Clubhouse,  Jeju, Korea
1997  Space of Sumi/Space of Mizu
1996  Church of Wood,  Hokkaido, Japan
1992  M Building,  Tokyo, Japan
1991  Church of Stone,  Hokkaido, Japan
1988  Scarved Tower,  Seoul, Korea
1985  Suculpor's Studio,  Kagawa, Japan
1975  India Ink House,  Tokyo, Japan
1973  Guest House at Karuizawa

Collections 
The Museum of Modern Art,  Saitama, Japan 
Museum of Modern Art,  Kitakyushu, Japan  
The National Museum of Art,  Japan 
Hasegawa Contemporary Museum,  Japan 
Collection of Jack Nicholson,  U.S.A  
Gwangju City Museum,  Korea 
National Museum Cultural Palace,  Nicaragua 
Museum national des Arts asiatiques-Guimet,  France 
Guggenheim Museum,  New York, U.S.A

References
 Itami Jun ou l'art de passer par le néant pour faire exister l'architecture, Le Monde, 2003
 MMCA ITAMI JUN: Architecture of Wind, 2014
 Musée Guimet à Paris, Itami Jun, un architecte coréen au japon, 2003
 Libération, ITAMI JUN, 2003

 Itami Jun, un architecte coréen au Japon
 Itami Jun back in spotlight with film
 Architect Jun Itami takes inspiration from nature
 Un architecte coréen du Japon : Itami Jun
 progetti Itami Jun
 ITAMI JUN: Architecture of the Wind

External links 
 ITAMI JUN + YOO Ehwa architects
 ITAMI JUN MUSEUM 유동룡미술관
 National Museum of Modern Art, Korea
 SPACE Magazine: Itami Jun Interview
 Itami Jun Architecte Archdaily

Japanese architects
1937 births
2011 deaths